Baseball B.C. (the B.C. Amateur Baseball Association) is the recognized provincial sport organization for amateur baseball in British Columbia. At present, the membership includes the following affiliated organizations:

B.C. Little League Baseball
B.C. Babe Ruth Baseball
B.C. Premier Baseball League
B.C. Junior Baseball Association
B.C. Senior Baseball Association
B.C. Baseball Umpires Association

References

Baseball in British Columbia
Baseball governing bodies in Canada
Sports governing bodies in British Columbia
Sports organizations established in 1968